Ahmed Barki (born 16 March 1980 in Hay Hassani) is a Moroccan boxer. At the 2012 Summer Olympics, he competed in the Men's light heavyweight, but was defeated in the first round.

References

1980 births
Living people
Sportspeople from Casablanca
Olympic boxers of Morocco
Boxers at the 2012 Summer Olympics
Light-heavyweight boxers
Moroccan male boxers